Joker is a 2016 Tamil-language political satire film from India. It was written and directed by Raju Murugan of Cuckoo fame and produced by S. R. Prakash Babu and S. R. Prabhu, under the banner Dream Warrior Pictures. The film stars Guru Somasundaram, Ramya Pandian, and  Gayathri Krishnaa in the lead roles, while Mu Ramaswamy, Bava Chelladurai, and Bala Murugan are doing supporting roles.

Joker was released on 12 August 2016 and received critical acclaim including praise for the screenplay and acting. At the 64th National Film Awards, the film won two awards including Best Feature Film - Tamil. The film won many awards from several nominations and became a sleeper hit.

Plot 
Mannar Mannan (Guru Somasundaram) is a villager who declares himself President of India. He leads many protests against various injustices happening around his village. Most of the time, he is seen as a joker. He and his small team of like-minded individuals sue on behalf of the villagers. One of Mannan's cases is against the local illegal sand mining group whose lorry maimed a goat. Another case is against a local school owner on whose property a toddler fell down an open deep bore well, resulting in brain damage. When this case was dismissed, Mannan stabs the school owner and is arrested. His past is told through the report submitted on the judge's order.

Mannan falls in love with Malliga, who is from the neighboring village. Malliga proclaims that she will marry him only if he builds a toilet at his home. He applies for a government scheme that provides incentive for building a toilet, along with his neighbors, but is cheated out of the government grant and is handed over just the basin. When the President of India announces a visit to the village to formally open the first toilet built under this scheme, Mannan's house is chosen. This prompts the village councilor to complete the unfinished toilet. It is still unfinished when the security team refuses clearance and another villager's toilet is chosen instead. Mallika yearns to use the toilet. When she does use it during a storm, the unfinished walls collapse on her and is discovered the next day by Mannan, the day of the President's visit. The police and the politicians lock him up in his house when he demands an ambulance. It was too late when Malliga is finally taken to the hospital. She goes into a vegetative state, and the foetus was lost. Mannan petitions all the way to the Supreme Court to grant euthanasia to his wife. He loses his mind while he waits for a verdict. He takes up various causes and is beaten in the police station every time.

Mannan gets out on bail to go to the final hearing in the Supreme Court. The justices deny the euthanasia petition and order a mental evaluation of Mannan. Mannan walks out of the hospital and hitchhikes his way back to his village. He is hit by a lorry of the sand miners. He is identified in the mortuary by his associates. Mannan's sister blames his associates for his death. In the end, the associates take care of Mannan's wife, while also reporting his death as a murder.

Cast

Guru Somasundaram as Mannar Mannan
Ramya Pandian as Malliga
Gayathri Krishnaa as Isai
Mu Ramaswamy as 'Potti Case' Ponnoonjal
Bava Chelladurai
P. V. Anandakrishnan as SP
Kaniyappan as Goat Owner
V. Thamaraiselvan as Collector's PA
S. A. Letchuman as Flashback Collector
Vimala as Convent sister
S. Mahalakshmi as Nurse
Arts Kannan as Akhila's father

Production
Actor Guru Somasundaram said, "Working with Raju Murugan was very good and organic. Organic means, the procedures involved in film making, which included exhaustive script discussions. In the pre-production stage itself, we decided on everything, from the look of a character to the manner of dialogue delivery to the costumes to everything. We completed 90% of the film through rehearsals and then only went to shoot. It was fantastic working with a director like Raju Murugan who is very clear about what he wanted.' The film was completely shot in the regions around Dharmapuri in late 2015. Talking about the film, Raju Murugan says, ‘This film was completely shot in Dharmapuri. We’ve also managed to get the localities of Dharmapuri to play key roles in the film. The problems of modern India have been narrated in a humorous manner". The movie is produced by S. R. Prakashbabu and S. R. Prabhu through their production house Dream Warrior Pictures. While speaking to press, S. R. Prabhu said that, "he was supposed to produce Raj Murugan's debut directorial Cuckoo, but things didn't go on as well due to some reasons, but now is elated to have his film produced by Dream Warrior Pictures". During the press meet, Raju Murugan said, “I am not sure if Joker will click as a super hit in box office, but am happy for having made a good film". Censor board has given "Unrestricted Public Exhibition" rating for this movie for India. Also the director said, "Soon after my first film, I happened to travel all over the country and found certain things among the people with poverty and this inspired me to write a plot based on this".

This movie emphasis the necessity of toilets for all rural homes. Even the Indian Prime Minister Narendra Modi has addressed this issue. Hence medias are asking Prime Minister to watch the film. In the movie, protagonist thinks himself as The President of India. "Joker explores different side of me", says Guru Somasundaram. Joker has been selected for screening under Tamil Film competition for 14th Chennai International Film Festival to be held in January 2017 at Chennai. Joker won Best Tamil Film Award at 64th National Film Award which was announced in April 2017.

Release
The satellite rights of the film were sold to Jaya TV.

Awards 
 Best Film Award at 14th Chennai International Film Festival 2016 
 Best Production Award at Ananda Vikatan Cinema Awards 2016
 Best Dialogue Award at Ananda Vikatan Awards 2016
 Best Film Award at Norway Tamil Film Festival 2017
 Best Tamil Film Award at Zee Cine Awards 2017
 Best Feature Film in Tamil at 64th National Film Award
 Best Male Playback Singer at 64th National Film Award 
 Best Actor Male at Behindwoods Gold Medal 2017 
 Best Dialogue Writer at Behindwoods Gold Medal 2017 
 Best Film Award at Behindwoods Gold Medal 2017
 Best Film Award at 64th Filmfare Awards South
 Best Playback Singer (Male) Award at 64th Filmfare Awards South

Soundtrack

The soundtrack album featuring six tracks, which was composed by Sean Roldan. Yugabharathi and Ramesh Vaidya wrote the lyrics for the songs. Most of the singers are folks artist native to Dharmapuri where the movie was filmed.

The first single track "Ennanga Sir Unga Sattam" was released on 16 May 2016, which is a satirical song. A 20-second promo of the song was released, a day before the single release on 15 May 2016. The opening track of this album is a number on politics. Quite an unusual kickstart, this one is set to tune and percussion as a period set song. Sounding typically like a song straight out of Eastman print rich black and white, the song questions a prospective leader who campaigns to vote for him, on what his plans are, for the next five years. Sung in the rustic voices of Arandhai Bava and K Perumal, titch for the context, Yugabharathi's lyrics are subtle yet strong. Close on the heels of elections in the state, although coming across as a lighthearted thread of questions, the song carries a palpably heavy and looming question, in strong and smart choice of words.

The second single track "Chellamma" was directly launched at the Suryan FM 93.5 Radio Station, Chennai on 1 June 2016, featuring Sean Roldan and Raju Murugan in a morning show. This song is sans beats, and relies on a sinewy orchestra for the background support. The song opens with Hindi lyrics, before opening out as a loving call in Lalitha's voice. The song is the rendition of an affectionate solo, for a bosom one, caring dearly in each phrase. Words for this one have been cherry picked by Ramesh Vaidya, that speak of the speciality in the relationship, relating it to beautiful aspects of nature in parts, and reminiscing in poetic memories in parts. In all, this call of love is tender yet loud and clear.

The complete soundtrack album was released, with a formal press meet held on 8 June 2016 at Prasad Labs, Chennai with prominent directors Bala, Vetrimaaran, music composer Santhosh Narayanan and other celebrities attended the event along with the film's cast and crew. Within hours of its release, the album received positive reviews from critics. Behindwoods gave the album 3.25/5 stars, saying that "the album is like a thought provoking musical journey with its own take on satires and the incomplete aspects of life!" Indiaglitz gave it a 3.25/5, calling it a "period set apotheosis." MusicAloud reviewed the album as one of the best soundtracks album, stating that "Director Raju Murugan manages to deliver an excellent soundtrack yet again, this time from Sean Roldan" and rated the album 8.5/10. Top10 Cinema gave the album favourable reviews stating that "The title ‘Joker’ and its significance in accordance to what it emphasizes goes very well with the songs as well .Very rarely, the songs become an integral part of screenplays and after listening to all the songs in Joker, you tend to accept it. The choice of singers, very well scrupulously orchestrated instrumentals and balancing with sound works out best results."

Sundarayyar won the 64th National Film Award at the Best Male Playback Singer for singing "Jasmine-U". This is his debut film as a singer.

Legacy
The first line of the song "Ennanga Sir Unga Sattam" inspired the movie of the same name.

References

External links
  (IMDb)
 joker at Moviesda
 Joker website

2016 films
2010s Tamil-language films
Indian political satire films
Films scored by Sean Roldan
Best Tamil Feature Film National Film Award winners
Films directed by Raju Murugan
2010s political satire films